Urodilatin (URO) is a hormone that causes natriuresis by increasing renal blood flow. It is secreted in response to increased mean arterial pressure and increased blood volume from the cells of the distal tubule and collecting duct. It is important in oliguric patients (such as those with acute kidney injury and chronic kidney failure) as it lowers serum creatinine and increases urine output.

Interactions
Atrial natriuretic peptide (CDD/ANP-99-126) is a hormone system of clinical importance. Urodilatin (CDD/ ANP-95-126) is a homologue natriuretic peptide that differs from CDD/ANP-99-126, which is excreted into the circulation via exocytosis. The prototype of the natriuretic hormones is cardiodilatin / atrial natriuretic peptide (CDD/ANP). The endocrine heart is composed of specific myoendocrine cells that synthesize and secrete the natriuretic peptide hormones, which exhibit diuretic and vasorelaxant properties; secretion is the basis for a paracrine system regulating water and sodium reabsorption. 

Research efforts since the early 1980s have studied their effects on electrolyte homeostasis. When administered intravenously, urodilatin induces strong diuresis and natriuresis with tolerable hemodynamic side effects. Urodilatin is localized in the kidney, differentially processed (involved in the regulation of body fluid volume and water-electrolyte excretion, while circulating), and secreted into the urine. As a consequence, urodilatin is involved in drug development along with the prohormone CDD/ANP-1-126 and cardiodilatin CDD/ANP-99-126. A message for the preprohormone is transcribed in the heart and kidneys from the gene of NP type A, resulting in a cGMP-dependent signal transduction, which induces diuresis and natriuresis, differentially processed to a peptide of 32 amino acids from the same precursor as renal ANP, may not be identical to the circulating cardiac hormone ANP. The kidneys produce their own natriuretic 32-residue peptide. Urodilatin renal natriuretic peptide potency equals or exceeds that of Atriopeptin [ANP-(99-126)], the prototype of cardiodilatin. Atriopeptin is only of trivial importance in the regulation of sodium excretion during normal living conditions. 

Urodilatin is little affected by renal enzymes that inactivate atriopeptin, as the kidney elutes with urodilatin rather than with ANP. The degradation rates of (125I)-urodilatin and [125I]-ANP by pure recombinant NEP (rNEP) were compared. Phosphoramidon, a potent inhibitor of NEP, completely protected both peptides from metabolism by rNEP. Urodilatin has a four-residue extension at the N-terminus neutral endopeptidase-24.11 (NEP) plays a physiological role in metabolizing atrial natriuretic peptide, and C-type natriuretic peptide (prohormone) degraded the bioactive peptides at about half the rate though the C-terminal that compete with natriuretic peptides for hydrolysis by neutral endopeptidase.

References

Hormones of the kidneys
Peptides